The Kapiti Urban Area is a statistical area that was defined by Statistics New Zealand to cover a group of urban settlements of the Kapiti Coast District, in the Wellington Region. It was classified as a main urban area under the New Zealand Standard Areas Classification 1992 because its population exceeded 30,000.

The settlements comprise (north to south):
 Waikanae
 Paraparaumu (including Otaihanga, Raumati Beach and Raumati South)
 Paekākāriki

The largest settlement is Paraparaumu. Raumati may be considered a suburb of Paraparaumu or a separate town in its own right – there are no legal definitions for towns in New Zealand. Kapiti Urban Area is better described as a commuter area of Wellington than an independent city.

Under Statistical Standard for Geographic Areas 2018, Kapiti Urban Area was split into separate urban areas for the three settlements.

The Kapiti Coast District also includes the settlements of Te Horo and Ōtaki, which are outside Kapiti Urban Area.

References

Kapiti Coast District
Main urban areas in New Zealand